The 2005 National Hurling League, known for sponsorship reasons as the Allianz National Hurling League, was the 74th edition of the National Hurling League (NHL), an annual hurling competition for the GAA county teams. Kilkenny won the league, beating Clare in the final.

An experimental rule was trialled in the 2005 NHL, with two points being awarded for a point scored directly from a sideline cut.

Structure

Division 1
There are 12 teams in Division 1, divided into 1A and 1B. Each team plays all the others in its group once, earning 2 points for a win and 1 for a draw.
The top three in 1A and 1B advance to Division 1 Section 1.
The bottom three in 1A and 1B go into the Division 1 Section 2.

Each team in Section 1 plays the other three teams that it did not play in the first five games. The top two teams go into the NHL final – only points earned in these last three games count.
Each team in Section 2 plays the other three teams that it did not play in the first five games. The bottom team is relegated – only points earned in these last three games count.

Division 2
There are 10 teams in Division 2, divided into 2A and 2B. Each team plays all the others in its group once, earning 2 points for a win and 1 for a draw.
The top three in 2A and 2B advance to the Division 2 Section 1.
The bottom two in 2A and 2B go into the Division 2 Section 2.

Each team in Section 1 plays the other three teams that it did not play in the first four games. The top two teams go into the Division 2 final – only points earned in these last three games count. Final winners are promoted.
Each team in Section 2 plays the other two teams that it did not play in the first four games. The bottom team is relegated – only points earned in these last two games count.

Division 3
There are 10 teams in Division 3, divided into 3A and 3B. Each team plays all the others in its group once, earning 2 points for a win and 1 for a draw.
The top three in 3A and 3B advance to the Division 3 Section 1.
The bottom two in 3A and 3B go into the Division 3 Section 2.

Each team in Section 1 plays the other three teams that it did not play in the first four games. The top two teams go into the Division 3 final – only points earned in these last three games count. Final winners are promoted.
Each team in Section 2 plays the other two teams that it did not play in the first four games. The top two play the Division 3 Shield Final.

Overview

Division 1
Brian Cody won his third league title in four seasons with Kilkenny, as 'the Cats' recorded just a single defeat in the entire league.  Clare, who were league runners-up, also suffered just one defeat in the group stages, however, they fell to Kilkenny in the final.

Down at the other end of the table, Dublin and Down went through the group stages without a single victory.  A relegation group of six teams meant that 'the Dubs' ended up at the bottom and faced relegation for the following season.

Division 2
Offaly won the Division 2 title after recording just one defeat throughout the group stages, thus returning to the top flight having been relegated the previous year.  Runners-up Carlow also faced only one defeat throughout the group stages until the last day of the league when they were defeated in the final by Offaly. Going down were Sligo who only had a draw with Wicklow to show for their entire campaign.

Division 3
Mayo and Donegal qualified for the league final in this division with Mayo winning promotion.  Cavan, having failed to win a single game in the group stage, finished bottom of Division 3B and could thus be regarded as the worst team of all the divisions.

Division 1

Galway came into the season as defending champions of the 2004 season. Down entered Division 1 as the promoted team.

On 2 May 2005, Kilkenny won the title following a 3-20 to 0-15 win over Clare in the final. It was their first league title since 2003 and their 12th National League title overall.

Dublin, who lost all of their group stage matches, were relegated from Division 1 after losing all of their matches in the relegation group. Offaly won Division 2 and secured promotion to the top tier.

Galway's Ger Farragher was the Division 1 top scorer with 2-54.

Division 1A table

Group stage

Division 1B table

Group stage

Group 1 table

Group 1 results

Group 2 table

Group 2 results

Knock-out stage

Final

Scoring statistics

Top scorers overall

Top scorers in a single game

Miscellaneous

 Wexford record their first victory over Tipperary at Semple Stadium since 1984.

Division 2

Division 2A table

Division 2B table

Group 1 table

Group 2 table

Knock-out stage

Final

Division 3

Division 3A table

Division 3B table

Group 1 table

Group 2 table

Knock-out stage

Shield Final

Final

References

External links
 All National Hurling League division results from 2005

League
National Hurling League seasons